is a former Japanese football player.

Playing career
Tokuni was born in Chitose on April 8, 1981. He joined J2 League club Consadole Sapporo based in his local from youth team in 2000. He played 1 match in Emperor's Cup. Although the club was promoted to J1 League from 2001, he could only play this match until 2001 and retired end of 2001 season.

Club statistics

References

External links
library.footballjapan.jp

1981 births
Living people
Association football people from Hokkaido
Japanese footballers
J1 League players
J2 League players
Hokkaido Consadole Sapporo players
Association football forwards
People from Chitose, Hokkaido